Ray Erickson (April 5, 1918 – November 28, 2002) was an American stock car racing driver. A Chicago, Illinois native, he ran four races in the inaugural season of the NASCAR Strictly Stock Series, finishing seventh in points with a best finish of second in his debut at Hamburg Speedway. Due in part to losing his arm in a hot rod accident in 1950, he would only run eight more races over the next four years, finishing no better than 17th.

Erickson was the listed owner of the #3 Hudson Hornet of Dick Rathmann for Rathmann's victory at Oakland in 1954.

References

External links
 Stats at Racing-Reference.info

1918 births
2002 deaths
NASCAR drivers
People from Chicago
Racing drivers from Chicago
Racing drivers from Illinois